The China International Convention Centers consists of two convention halls in Beijing, China. The Jing'anzhuang Center is located in downtown Chaoyang District while the new Tianzhu Center is located in Shunyi District, close to Beijing Capital International Airport.

Public transport
Sanyuanqiao station of Line 10 and Capital Airport Express, and Guangximen station of Line 13 are closely located to Jing'anzhuang Center.

China Int'l Exhibition Center station of Line 15 serves Tianzhu New Center, connecting it to downtown Beijing. Several bus routes are available near both site.

References

Buildings and structures in Beijing
Tourist attractions in Beijing
Convention and exhibition centers in China